Windmill Hill, Avebury, is a Neolithic causewayed enclosure in Wiltshire, England, that gave the name to the Windmill Hill culture (now considered as several separate archaeological cultures).

Other locations named Windmill Hill include:

Australia 

 Windmill Hill, Appin, a heritage-listed former farm and now water catchment area in Wollondilly Shire, New South Wales
 Windmill Hill, Sydney, New South Wales, former name of Observatory Park, Sydney

United Kingdom 
Windmill Hill, Avebury
Windmill Hill, Bristol 
Windmill Hill, Buckinghamshire 
Windmill Hill, East Sussex 
Windmill Hill, Hampshire 
Windmill Hill, Kent 
Windmill Hill, Somerset

United States 

Windmill Hill (Dublin, New Hampshire), house listed on the National Register of Historic Places
Windmill Hill Historic District, Jamestown, Rhode Island, listed on the National Register of Historic Places

Other 
Windmill Hill, Gibraltar

See also 
Windmill Hill Mill, Herstmonceux